Remains To Be Heard is a 1970 album credited to (The) Aynsley Dunbar Retaliation, but with minor participation by Dunbar himself. The group proper had disbanded by then. Former lead vocalist Victor Brox assembled it under management suggestion.

Track listing
All titles published by Lupus Music.
 "Invitation To A Lady" (Victor Brox, John Moorshead, Victor Dmochowski, Aynsley Dunbar) 4:03
 "Blood On Your Wheels" (Brox, Moorshead, Dmochowski, Dunbar) 5:20
 "Downhearted" (Brox, Morshead, Dmochowski, Dunbar) 6:12
 "Whistlin' Blues" (Brox) 2:55
 "Keep Your Hands Out" (Brox) 4:02
 "Sleepy Town Sister" (Brox) 4:18
 "Fortune City" (Brox) 4:04 
 "Put Some Love On You" (Brox) 3:40
 "Bloody Souvenir" (Brox) 4:28
 "Toga" (Brox) 5:10

Personnel
The Aynsley Dunbar Retaliation 
Annette Brox - vocals on tracks 4, 6-10
Victor Brox - vocals, piano, organ, percussion
John Moorshead - rhythm and lead guitar
Alex Dmochowski - bass
Aynsley Dunbar - drums, percussion on tracks 1-3, 5

References

1970 albums
Aynsley Dunbar albums
Liberty Records albums
Albums with cover art by Hipgnosis